Tagudin–Cervantes–Sabangan Road (also known as Mountain Province–Ilocos Sur Road or Bessang Pass), signed as National Route 205 (N205) of the Philippine highway network, is a  national secondary road in the Philippines that connects between the provinces of Ilocos Sur and Mountain Province.

Route description
The road starts at the junction of Halsema Highway as its eastern terminus. It passes throughout the remaining towns in Mountain Province before entering to the Ilocos Sur province. Its characteristics have numerous hairpin curves, turnpins and steep portions (particularly in Cervantes) along the mountainous route within the Cordillera mountains. Along the way, it provides an access to the Bessang Pass Natural Monument, which is located at the highest elevation of the road before going to the lowlands of the province. The road ends at the junction of Manila North Road in Tagudin.

From the World War II memorial marker in Tagudin, the road traverses Suyo and Cervantes in Ilocos Sur. Another road was in junction with the road, that leads to Mankayan and Buguias in Benguet. The road continues to Sabangan, where Halsema Highway is.

Intersections

References

Roads in Ilocos Sur
Roads in Mountain Province